Third-seeded Manuel Santana defeated Nicola Pietrangeli 6–3, 6–1, 4–6, 7–5 in the final to win the men's singles tennis title at the 1964 French Championships.

Seeds
The seeded players are listed below. Manuel Santana is the champion; others show the round in which they were eliminated.

  Roy Emerson (quarterfinals)
  Pierre Darmon (semifinals)
  Manuel Santana (champion)
  Jan-Erik Lundqvist (semifinals)
  Rafael Osuna (fourth round)
  Fred Stolle (fourth round)
  Martin Mulligan (fourth round)
  Nicola Pietrangeli (final)
  Michael Sangster (third round)
  Eugene Scott (quarterfinals)
  Tony Roche (second round)
  Cliff Drysdale (quarterfinals)
  John Newcombe (second round)
  Robert Keith Wilson (third round)
  Ken Fletcher (fourth round)
  Nikola Pilić (fourth round)

Draw

Key
 Q = Qualifier
 WC = Wild card
 LL = Lucky loser
 r = Retired

Finals

Earlier rounds

Section 1

Section 2

Section 3

Section 4

Section 5

Section 6

Section 7

Section 8

External links
 

1964
1964 in French tennis